Bowling Digest was a Ten-pin bowling magazine. It was published from 1983 to 2005. Jeri Edwards was the editor of the magazine between 1993 and 2000. The magazine published four times per year. The publisher was the Century Publishing Co. The headquarters was in Evanston, Illinois.

References

External links
Bowling Digest review

Defunct magazines published in the United States
Magazines established in 1983
Magazines disestablished in 2005
Magazines published in Chicago
Quarterly magazines published in the United States
Sports magazines published in the United States
Ten-pin bowling magazines